SSM Health is a Catholic, not-for-profit United States health care system with 11,000 providers and nearly 39,000 employees in four states: Missouri, Illinois, Oklahoma, and Wisconsin.

Based in St. Louis, Missouri, SSM Health owns hospitals, pediatric medical centers, outpatient centers, clinics, surgery centers, nursing homes, assisted living facilities, physician offices, emergency centers, rehabilitation facilities, urgent care centers, home care, and hospice.

History of SSM Health 
SSM Health traces its roots to 1872, when Mother Mary Odilia Berger and four other sisters came to St. Louis from Germany, after caring for sick and wounded soldiers during the Franco-Prussian War. Facing religious persecution in Germany, they came to the United States. When they arrived in St. Louis they began providing nursing care to people in their own homes. That winter, when a smallpox epidemic hit St. Louis, the sisters cared for the sick and dying. For a short time, people referred to them as the Smallpox Sisters. In 1874, the congregation received its formal name: the Sisters of St. Mary (SSM) from the parish where their convent was located, St. Mary of Victories near the riverfront in St. Louis.

Five years after their arrival in St. Louis, the sisters borrowed $16,000, to open their first hospital, St. Mary's Infirmary. Almost 60 percent of their patients were unable to pay for their health care services. Account ledgers from this time identify those who were unable to pay for their services as an “ODL,” a designation that stood for “Our Dear Lord’s.” During this time, the sisters relied on God to provide for their needs as they cared for the poor.

Most of the health care facilities that today belong to SSM Health were previously part of a group of hospitals owned by the Sisters of St. Mary and centrally governed, but not centrally managed. In the mid-1980s, the sponsoring congregation decided to reorganize its hospitals into a system of centrally managed health care providers, and SSM Health was created in 1986. Today the system is managed by a team of professionals—both lay and religious—and governed by members of the sponsoring congregation as well as by laypersons from the communities served by its facilities.

In 2012, SSM Health stated that it was 'disappointed with the contraceptive mandate' regarding being legally forced to cover such items by the Affordable Care Act, against Catholic freedom of conscience.

In 2013, Dean Health System, a large multi-specialty physician group and health plan, finalized a deal to merge Dean and its subsidiaries, including Dean Health Plan, into SSM Health. The merger became effective on September 1, 2013, after all necessary regulatory approvals were received.

In 2018, SSM rebranded its Oklahoma hospitals from "St. Anthony" to "SSM Health St. Anthony". The health system's physician's group in the state became known as SSM Health Medical Group. Also in 2018, SSM Health acquired Agnesian HealthCare from Fond du Lac, Wisconsin.

SSM Health is sponsored by the Franciscan Sisters of Mary and is one of the largest Catholic hospital systems in the United States.

Malcolm Baldrige National Quality Award 
In 2002, SSM Health became the first health care organization in history to receive the Malcolm Baldrige National Quality Award, the highest award for quality in the U.S.

SSM Health Facilities

Missouri
 SSM Health St. Louis University Hospital - St. Louis
 SSM Health Cardinal Glennon Children's Hospital
 SSM Health DePaul Hospital - Bridgeton
 SSM Health St. Clare Hospital - Fenton
 SSM Health St. Joseph Hospital - Lake Saint Louis
 SSM Health St. Joseph Hospital - St. Charles
 SSM Health St. Joseph Hospital - Wentzville
 SSM Health St. Mary's Hospital - Richmond Heights
 SSM Health St. Mary's Hospital - Jefferson City
 SSM Health St. Mary's Hospital Kansas City

Oklahoma
SSM Health — St. Anthony Hospital - Main Campus (Oklahoma City)
SSM Health — St. Anthony Bone and Joint Hospital (Oklahoma City)
SSM Health — St. Anthony Healthplex East (Oklahoma City)
SSM Health — St. Anthony Healthplex North (Oklahoma City)
SSM Health — St. Anthony Healthplex South (Oklahoma City)
SSM Health — St. Anthony Healthplex Mustang (Oklahoma City metro)
SSM Health — St. Anthony Hospital Shawnee (Oklahoma City metro)
SSM Health — St. Anthony Urgent Care Center Shawnee

Wisconsin

SSMHealth St. Clare Hospital - Baraboo
SSMHealth St. Clare Meadows Care Center Baraboo
SSMHealth St. Mary's Hospital - Madison
SSMHealth St. Mary's Care Center - Madison
SSMHealth St. Mary's Hospital - Janesville
Dean Health Plan - Madison
Dean Medical Group - Madison
SSMHealth St. Agnes Hospital - Fond du Lac
SSMHealth Waupun Memorial Hospital - Waupun
SSMHealth Ripon Medical Center - Ripon
SSMHealth Monroe Clinic - Monroe

Illinois
SSM Health St. Mary's Hospital - Centralia
SSM Health Good Samaritan Hospital - Mt. Vernon

Notes

External links 
SSM Health website

Healthcare in Missouri
Healthcare in Illinois
Healthcare in Wisconsin
Healthcare in Oklahoma
Hospital networks in the United States
Companies based in St. Louis
Catholic health care
Medical and health organizations based in Missouri
Catholic hospital networks in the United States